Ayr Township is one of sixteen townships in Adams County, Nebraska, United States. The population was 452 at the 2020 census.

A portion of the village of Ayr lies within the township.

See also
County government in Nebraska

References

External links
City-Data.com

Townships in Adams County, Nebraska
Hastings Micropolitan Statistical Area
Townships in Nebraska